Philip Bester and Peter Polansky were the defending champions but they chose to not compete together this time.

Bester played with Kamil Pajkowski, but they lost to Lester Cook and Michael Yani in the first round.

Polansky teamed up with Bruno Agostinelli and this pair lost in the first round too. They were eliminated by Pierre-Ludovic Duclos and Alexandre Kudryavtsev.

Colin Fleming and Ken Skupski defeated Amir Hadad and Harel Levy in the final 6–3, 7–6(6).

Seeds

Draw

Draw

References
 Doubles Draw

Challenger Banque Nationale de Granby
Challenger de Granby